Beavers is a surname. Notable people with the surname include:

Anthony Beavers (born 1963), American philosopher
Aubrey Beavers (born 1971), American football player
Brett Beavers, American songwriter
Clarence Beavers (1921–2017), American army officer
Darrian Beavers (born 1999), American football player
Eric Beavers (born 1964), American football player
Ethen Beavers, American comic book artist
Gavin Beavers (born 2005), American soccer player
George A. Beavers Jr. (1891–1989), American corporate executive
Gina Beavers (born 1974), American artist
Jackey Beavers (1937–2008), American singer
Jessie Mae Brown Beavers (1923–1989), American journalist
Jim Beavers, American songwriter
Keith Beavers (born 1983), Canadian swimmer
Larry Beavers (born 1985), American football player
Louise Beavers (1900–1962), American actress
Mae Beavers (born 1947), American politician
Paul Beavers (born 1978), English footballer
Robert Beavers (born 1949), American film director
Roberta Beavers (born 1942), American politician
Scott Beavers (born 1967), American football player
William Beavers (born 1935), American politician
Willie Beavers (born 1993), American football player

See also
Beaver (surname)
Beevers

 English-language surnames
Surnames from nicknames